Marin Robu (born 19 March 2000) is a Moldovan weightlifter. He won the bronze medal in the men's 81kg event at the 2021 World Weightlifting Championships held in Tashkent, Uzbekistan. He represented Moldova at the 2020 Summer Olympics in Tokyo, Japan.

In 2021, he won the silver medal in the men's 73kg event at the European Weightlifting Championships held in Moscow, Russia. He also competed at the World Weightlifting Championships in 2018, 2019 and 2022.

Career 

In 2019, he won the silver medal in the men's junior 73kg event at the European Junior & U23 Weightlifting Championships in Bucharest, Romania. A year later, he won the silver medal in the men's 73kg event at the Roma 2020 World Cup in Rome, Italy.

He represented Moldova at the 2020 Summer Olympics in Tokyo, Japan. He competed in the men's 73kg event.

He competed in the men's 81kg event at the 2022 World Weightlifting Championships in Bogotá, Colombia.

Achievements

References

External links 
 

Living people
2000 births
Place of birth missing (living people)
Moldovan male weightlifters
European Weightlifting Championships medalists
World Weightlifting Championships medalists
Weightlifters at the 2020 Summer Olympics
Olympic weightlifters of Moldova
21st-century Moldovan people